Giuseppe Di Stefano (Udine, 18 March 1989) is an Italian rugby union player.
His usual position is as a Prop and he currently plays for Fiamme Oro in Top12.

In 2015–16 Pro12 season he was name as Additional Player for Zebre and from 2017 to 2020 he played for Benetton  

In 2015 and 2016, Di Stefano was named in the Emerging Italy squad for the Tbilisi Cup and Nations Cup.

References

External links 
  Giuseppe DI STEFANORugby - Player statistics - It's rugby
 Eurosport profile
 ESPN profile

Rugby union props
1989 births
Living people
Sportspeople from Udine
Italian rugby union players
Fiamme Oro Rugby players
Benetton Rugby players